The 2016 Washington State Senate elections is one of the biennial legislative elections in Washington in which about half of the state's 49 legislative districts choose a state senator for a four-year term to the Washington State Senate. The other half of state senators are chosen in the next biennial election, so that about half of the senators, along with all the members of the Washington State House of Representatives, are elected every two years. 25 seats are regularly scheduled to be up this cycle, along with 1 additional seat holding a special election to fill an unexpired term: the 36th district, currently held by appointed Senator Reuven Carlyle, whose former incumbent Jeanne Kohl-Welles vacated the seat.

A top two primary election on August 9, 2016 determines which candidates appear on the November ballot. Candidates were allowed to declare a party preference. The general election took place on November 8, 2016.

The 2016 Election maintained effective Republican control of the Senate, because self-identified Democrat Tim Sheldon caucuses with the Republicans.

Overview

Composition

Results

District 1

District 2

District 3

District 4

District 5

District 9

District 10

District 11

District 12

District 14

District 16

District 17

District 18

District 19

District 20

District 22

District 23

District 24

District 25

District 27

District 28

District 36

District 39

District 40

District 41

District 49

Notes

References 

Washington State Senate elections
Senate
Washington State Senate